Piperitone is a natural monoterpene ketone which is a component of some essential oils. Both stereoisomers, the D-form and the L-form, are known.  The D-form has a peppermint-like aroma and has been isolated from the oils of plants from the genera Cymbopogon, Andropogon, and Mentha.  The L-form has been isolated from Sitka spruce.

Piperitone is used as the principal raw material for the production of synthetic menthol and thymol. The primary source of D/L-piperitone is from Eucalyptus dives, produced mainly in South Africa.

References

Ketones
Monoterpenes
Cyclohexenes